The A4 motorway is a motorway in Romania that serves as a bypass for the city of Constanța, between Ovidiu and the Port of Constanța, connecting with the A2 motorway via an interchange southwest of the city. It is 22 km long and is planned to be extended to approximately 60 kilometers, stretching further south to the Bulgarian border south of Mangalia, along the western Black Sea coast. The motorway is part of an extension of the Pan-European Corridor IV, that will be connecting with the Bulgarian city of Varna.

Description

The contract for the construction of the stretch of motorway between Ovidiu and Lazu was awarded in September 2008 to the joint venture between the Italian company Astaldi and the Spanish company FCC Construction, and was due to be completed until November 2011.

A new bridge was built over the Danube – Black Sea Canal, downstream of the Agigea lock, in order to allow access to the busier southern terminal of the Port of Constanța directly from the motorway. Works began in July 2010, and were planned to be completed in 2014.

The bypass was initially built with funds from the state budget, but in the end of 2014, the European Commission awarded funds for the construction from the Cohesion Fund.

The northern end is planned to be extended with an expressway through Tulcea and ending in Brǎila, including Brăila Bridge over Danube, that would be designated the "DEx8". As for the southern end, it is planned that tender procedures begin in 2023 for the segment between Agigea and 23 August ( 29 km), also termed the "Techirghiol Alternative", that would bypass Eforie and its surrounding area. This particular project would involve a reconfiguration of the junction with A2 in order to provide access to the new motorway segment, as well as to nearby Cumpăna.

Openings timeline
29 July 2011: Constanța West (interchange with A2) – Lazu segment (about 5 km).
30 September 2011: DN3 interchange – Constanța West interchange (3 km).
19 July 2012: Ovidiu – DN3 interchange (11 km).
12 July 2013: Lazu – Port of Constanța segment (2 km).

Exit list

References

External links

Map of the Constanța bypass (pdf file)
CNADNR – Varianta de ocolire Constanța

Motorways in Romania